Mehmet Nesim Öner (born 20 December 1994) is a Turkish former Paralympic athlete who competed at international track and field competitions. He is a European champion in middle-distance running, he also competed at the 2012 Summer Paralympics where he did not medal.

Disability
When Öner was ten years old, he stepped on a landmine and lost his left arm and one of his eyes while he was grazing animals in the village of Uzunova in Kulp district near his home.

References

1994 births
Living people
Sportspeople from Diyarbakır
Paralympic athletes of Turkey
Turkish male middle-distance runners
Athletes (track and field) at the 2012 Summer Paralympics
Medalists at the World Para Athletics European Championships
21st-century Turkish people